Vottignasco is a comune (municipality) in the Province of Cuneo in the Italian region Piedmont, located about  south of Turin and about  north of Cuneo.

Vottignasco borders two other municipalities: Savigliano and Villafalletto.

References

Cities and towns in Piedmont